Lebia festiva is a species of beetle in the family Carabidae.

Description
The color of the body is dark purple, with orangy-blackish legs and antennas.

Distribution
The species can be found in Khorasan Province, Gonobad, Iran.

References

Lebia
Beetles described in 1836
Endemic fauna of Iran